Grierson's Raid was a Union cavalry raid during the Vicksburg Campaign of the American Civil War. It ran from April 17 to May 2, 1863, as a diversion from Maj. Gen. Ulysses S. Grant's main attack plan on Vicksburg, Mississippi.

Background

Early in 1863, Major General Charles Hamilton, the commander of the Corinth section of Grant's division, suggested what would eventually become Grierson's Raid.  Subsequently, due to Hamilton's insistence on procuring a command that would garner him more glory, Hamilton offered his resignation.  Grant quickly accepted.

In the Western Theater of the American Civil War, Confederate cavalry raids under commanders such as Lt. Gen. Nathan Bedford Forrest and Brig. Gen. John Hunt Morgan had harassed Union expeditions, namely at the Battle of Parker's Crossroads, where Forrest captured three hundred Union soldiers under Brig. Gen. Jeremiah C. Sullivan, but lost all of the artillery pieces belonging to his own command. The task of drawing the attention of Confederate raiders away from the Siege of Vicksburg fell to Col. Benjamin Grierson, a former music teacher who disliked horses after being kicked in the head by one as a child. Grierson's cavalry brigade consisted of the 6th and 7th Illinois and 2nd Iowa Cavalry regiments.

The Raid
Grierson and his 1,700 horse troopers, some in Confederate uniforms serving as scouts for the main force, rode over  through hostile territory (from southern Tennessee, through the State of Mississippi and into Union-held Baton Rouge, Louisiana), over routes no Union soldier had traveled before. They tore up railroads and burned crossties, freed slaves, burned Confederate storehouses, destroyed locomotives and commissary stores, ripped up bridges and trestles, burned buildings, and inflicted ten times the casualties they received, all while detachments of his troops made feints confusing the Confederates as to his actual whereabouts, intent and direction. Total casualties for Grierson's Brigade during the raid were three killed, seven wounded, and nine missing. Five sick and wounded men were left behind along the route, too ill to continue.  Greirson reported to have killed and wounded 100 Confederates, captured 500, destroyed between 50 and 60 miles of railroad, destroyed over 3,000 stand of arms, and captured 1,000 horses and mules.

Confederate Lt. Gen. John C. Pemberton, commander of the Vicksburg garrison, had few cavalry and could do nothing to stop Grierson.  On April 21, 1863, Confederate cavalry commander Maj. Gen. Nathan Bedford Forrest, had captured another Union raider, Col. Abel Streight, in Alabama following a poorly supplied and poorly planned raid (Streight's Raid).

Although many other Confederate cavalry units pursued Grierson vigorously across the state (most notably those led by Wirt Adams and Robert V. Richardson), they were unsuccessful in stopping the raid. Grierson and his troopers, exhausted by days in the saddle, ultimately rode into Union-occupied Baton Rouge, Louisiana. With an entire division of Pemberton's soldiers tied up defending the vital Vicksburg-Jackson railroad from the evasive Grierson, combined with Maj. Gen. William T. Sherman's feint northeast of Vicksburg (the Battle of Snyder's Bluff), the beleaguered Confederates were unable to muster the forces necessary to oppose Grant's eventual landing below Vicksburg on the east side of the Mississippi at Bruinsburg.

In popular media
The movie The Horse Soldiers, directed by John Ford, and starring John Wayne, William Holden and Constance Towers, and the Harold Sinclair novel of the same name on which it is based, are fictional variations of Grierson's Raid.

See also
 Battle of Newton's Station
 Clan Grierson

References

Further reading
 Laliki, Tom (2004). Grierson's Raid: A Daring Cavalry Strike Through the Heart of the Confederacy. Farrar, Straus and Giroux, New York. .
 Lardas, Mark (2010). Roughshod Through Dixie – Grierson’s Raid 1863, Osprey Raid Series #12; Osprey Publishing. 

1863 in the United States
Vicksburg campaign
Cavalry raids of the American Civil War
1863 in Tennessee
1863 in Louisiana
Military operations of the American Civil War in Tennessee
Military operations of the American Civil War in Louisiana
April 1863 events
May 1863 events